NVG may refer to:

 NATO Vector Graphics
 Neovascular glaucoma
 Night vision goggles, a specific night vision device
 Northern Volunteers Group, a non-governmental organization in Tamale, Ghana
 NVG Card, another name for PlayStation Vita card
 New Venture Gear